Abhishek Singh (born 5 March 1981) is an Indian politician from the Bharatiya Janata Party. He was a member of the 16th Lok Sabha, the lower house of the Indian Parliament representing Rajnandgaon. He is the son of former Chief Minister of Chhattisgarh, Raman Singh.

Early life 
Abhishek Singh was born on 5 March 1981 at Kawardha. He is the son of Raman Singh and Veena Singh. He did his engineering from NIT Raipur after which completed his M.B.A. from XLRI- Xavier School of Management.

Political career 
Upon completion of his education, Singh entered politics and campaigned for the Bharatiya Janata Party (BJP) during the 2013 Chhattisgarh Legislative Assembly election in the districts of Rajnandgaon and Kawardha. In April 2014, the BJP declared him as their candidate to contest the general election from Rajnandgaon after Madhusudan Yadav, the then member from the constituency, was denied a ticket. He won the election by a margin of more than 235,000 votes and 33, became the youngest member of parliament elected from Chhattisgarh.

See also 
 List of members of the 16th Lok Sabha of India

References 

1981 births
Living people
India MPs 2014–2019
Bharatiya Janata Party politicians from Chhattisgarh
Lok Sabha members from Chhattisgarh
National Institute of Technology, Raipur alumni
People from Kabirdham district
People from Rajnandgaon
XLRI – Xavier School of Management alumni